Jeff Kavianu (born May 2, 1964) is a Ghanaian politician and member of the Sixth Parliament of the Fourth Republic of Ghana representing the Upper manya Krobo Central Constituency in the Eastern Region on the ticket of the National Democratic Congress.

Personal life 
Kavianu is a Christian (New Fountain of Life Ministries International; Presiding Elder). He is married with four children.

Early life and education 
Kavianu was born on May 2, 1964. He hails from Odumase-Krobo, a town in the Eastern Region of Ghana. He entered University of Gothenburg, Sweden, and obtained his bachelor's of science degree in social work in 2006.

Politics 
Kavianu is a member of the National Democratic Congress (NDC). In 2012, he contested for the Upper manya Krobo Central seat on the ticket of the NDC sixth parliament of the fourth republic and won.

Employment 
 CEO, Rural Water and Sanitation Services
 Manager/administrator/HR practitioner

References 

1964 births
Living people
National Democratic Congress (Ghana) politicians
Ghanaian MPs 2013–2017
Ghanaian MPs 2017–2021